Bicyclus nachtetis is a butterfly in the family Nymphalidae. It is found in Cameroon, the Democratic Republic of the Congo, Angola, north-western Tanzania and possibly Uganda. The habitat consists of swamp forests.

Adults are attracted to fermenting bananas.

References

Elymniini
Butterflies described in 1965